Balaban is a village in northern Aleppo Governorate, northern Syria.

With 227 inhabitants, as per the 2004 census, Balaban administratively belongs to Nahiya Jarabulus within Jarabulus District. Nearby localities include Dabis  to the north.

References 

Populated places in Jarabulus District